The sixteenth season of American Idol premiered on March 11, 2018, on the ABC television network. It is the show's first season to air on ABC, and after 15 years on Fox, Ryan Seacrest continued his role as the show's host, while Katy Perry, Luke Bryan, and Lionel Richie joined as judges. Maddie Poppe from Clarksville, Iowa won the season on May 21, 2018, while Caleb Lee Hutchinson was the runner-up, and Gabby Barrett finished in third place. Poppe was the first female winner since Candice Glover in season twelve.

Background
In early 2017, Variety reported that FremantleMedia was in talks to revive the show for NBC or for its original network, Fox. A dispute between Fremantle and Core Media Group derailed these plans. Then, in May 2017, it was announced that ABC was making a bid to revive the program. Later, ABC announced that it had acquired the rights to the series, and that American Idol would return for the 2017–18 television season. On November 6, 2017, it was announced that the revival season would premiere on March 11, 2018.

On July 20, 2017, it was announced on Live with Kelly and Ryan, that Ryan Seacrest would be returning as the host for the revival season. On May 16, 2017, Katy Perry was the first judge to be announced by ABC. On September 24, 2017, Luke Bryan was the second judge to be announced for the revival season. On September 29, 2017, Lionel Richie was the third and final judge to be announced. On February 21, 2018, it was announced that iHeartRadio radio personality Bobby Bones would be the mentor for the Top 24 this season.

On April 23, 2018, ABC announced that the April 29, May 6, and May 13 live shows of the season would air across all mainland U.S. time zones, a first for American Idol. Radio Disney also broadcast its first season of American Idol Insider.

Regional auditions
In June 2017, it was announced that American Idol would begin two bus tours in 19 cities, later increased to 22, for audition starting August 17, 2017.  Those who passed their first audition would go in front of the producers where they would be selected to appear before the judges in different cities. Instead of focusing on a city in each aired episode as in previous seasons, this season each episode showed a compilations of auditions from different cities.

During the live broadcast of the 2017 American Music Awards, three contestants who did not pass the audition in front of the judges were given one more chance to allow the public to vote for them. The three candidates were Maris, Britney Holmes and Dominique Smith. The winner of the golden ticket to Hollywood was then revealed the following night on an episode of Dancing with the Stars. Lionel Richie appeared in the show announcing that the public vote was in favor of Britney Holmes, a 28-year-old vocal coach from Texas, who is headed to Hollywood as the first declared semifinalist of the season.

Hollywood Week
Hollywood Week aired over two episodes on March 26 and April 1. It featured three rounds: Lines of 10, Group Round, and Solo Round.  In the first round, each contestant sang individually, and after ten sang, they gathered in a line. Those who impressed the judges and the producers advanced to the next round where the contestants performed in groups of four or five, singing a song together. The remaining auditionees who passed the group rounds performed their final solos to advance in the Showcase Round.

Showcase Round
The Showcase Round aired on April 2, which featured the top 50 performing for the judges and a live audience at Exchange LA, a nightclub in Los Angeles. The following day, the judges narrowed the number of contestants down from 50 to 24 in the Final Judgement. The top 24 contestants then moved on to perform solos and celebrity duets.

The following is a list of the contestants who reached the Top 24 and the song they performed at the Showcase:

Color key:

Top 24
The Top 24 contestants were split into two groups of twelve. Prerecorded performances at the Academy in the Heart of LA of the first group aired on April 8 and the second group on April 15. On the following day each week, prerecorded performances of each contestant's duet aired, as did the judges' selection of seven contestants from each group to advance to the Top 14. Idol contestants were paired with celebrity singers as their duet partners. The artists who duetted with the Top 24 included: Banners, Aloe Blacc, Bishop Briggs, Cam, Colbie Caillat, Luis Fonsi, Andy Grammer, Lea Michele, Patrick Monahan, Rachel Platten, Bebe Rexha, Sugarland, and Allen Stone.

Color key:

Group 1

Group 2

Top 14 (April 22 and 23)
The Top 14 performances were taped on April 21, 2018, and aired on Sunday, April 22, followed with the live results on Monday, April 23.

Color key:

Live shows
Color key:

Week 1 Top 10 – Disney Night (April 29)
The Top 10 performed Disney songs on Sunday, April 29, 2018. Idina Menzel served as a guest mentor.

Week 2: Top 7 – Prince/Birth Year Night (May 6)
The Top 7 performed tribute performances to the late Prince and songs from their birth years. Nick Jonas served as a guest mentor.

Week 3: Top 5 – Carrie Underwood/Mothers' Day Dedications (May 13)
The Top 5 performed songs by Carrie Underwood and songs dedicated to their mothers. Underwood served as mentor for the week and performed with the contestants.

Week 4: Finale – Winner's Song/Reprise Song/Hometown Dedication (May 20 and 21)
The Top 3 performed their winner’s song, a reprise of their favorite performance of the season and a song dedicated to their hometowns, which they visited. Bobby Bones returned as mentor this week.

Color key:

Elimination chart 
Color key:

Top 10 contestants

 Maddie Poppe (born December 5, 1997) is from Clarksville, Iowa. Poppe's father Trent was a member of his bluegrass band for a while and had performed throughout with other local bands. She first started singing at sixth grade when her sister encouraged her to perform a duet at her high school. She was also a member of her school band, the choir and studied musical theater in class. She was a former graphic design student at Iowa Central Community College before transferring to Hawkeye Community College to study digital mass media in 2017. She performed at many venues in Clarksville and had performed at RAGBRAI in 2014. She won a golden ticket at the New York City auditions after performing "Rainbow Connection" which impressed the judges. In Hollywood Week, she sang "Dreams" by Brandi Carlile in her first solo and performed her original song "Don't Ever Let Your Children Grow Up" as her final solo performance. She advanced in the Top 24 after performing "Me and Bobby McGee" in the Showcase Round. During the course of the season, she played ukulele, guitar and keyboard. She was announced as the winner on May 21. Her debut single "Going, Going Gone" ranked at the US  Billboard Digital Songs.

 Caleb Lee Hutchinson (born March 2, 1999) is from Dallas, Georgia. He learned to sing at the age of nine and learned to play guitar and write his own songs at the age of thirteen. He performed opening acts across Atlanta for Gene Watson, T. Graham Brown, The Kentucky Headhunters and Idol season 4 runner-up Bo Bice. He won the Georgia Country Teen Showcase last year. He passed the audition at Atlanta after impressing the judges by performing "If It Hadn't Been For Love". In Hollywood Week, he performed Keith Whitley's "Don't Close Your Eyes" in the first solo round. He made it to Showcase Week by singing Josh Turner's "Your Man" as his second solo performance. After performing "I Was Wrong" by Chris Stapleton, Hutchinson advanced to the Top 24 semifinals. He was announced as the runner-up on May 21.

 Gabby Barrett (born March 5, 2000) is from Pittsburgh, Pennsylvania. Barrett started singing at the age of nine. She was a member of a local gospel choir for two years and an active member of the Pittsburgh community. The grandparents of her father and general manager Blase, are songwriters for Frank Sinatra and Tony Bennett. She had performed more than 100 concerts at different venues around her hometown such as the children's hospital for benefit events and opening acts for Keith Urban, Cole Swindell, Daya and Toby Keith. Barrett, who endured bullying at her high school Serra Catholic in McKeesport, organized a benefit concert tour, visiting area Pittsburgh schools for anti-bullying in 2017. She auditioned at Nashville, intending to perform her audition song but the judges suggested her to sing a church song instead before giving her the ticket after she sang "His Eye Is on the Sparrow". She sang Aretha Franklin's "Ain't No Way" in her final solo performance to advance in the Showcase Round where she then sang "Church Bells" by Carrie Underwood, one of her initial audition songs, to join the Top 24. Barrett finished in third place on May 21.

 Cade Foehner (born July 24, 1996) is from Shelbyville, Texas. Foehner was the lead guitarist for Johnson's Lost Crowes and won the Dallas International Guitar Festival as best guitarist at the age of 17. He was a member of a worship group at his local church. He studied Biblical theology at Liberty University. He earned a golden ticket from the judges after singing The Black Crowes' "She Talks to Angels" in his audition at New Orleans. In the Hollywood round, he performed "The Thrill Is Gone" by B.B. King as his first solo and "Feel It Still" by Portugal. The Man in the final solo round. He sang Kaleo's "No Good" to advance in the semifinals during Showcase Week. Foehner was one of the two finalists eliminated on May 13, tied at fourth place.
 Michael J. Woodard (born October 6, 1997) was a bowling alley attendant from Philadelphia, Pennsylvania. Woodard's first experience in music was singing "A Little Candle" at a Christmas pageant. When he was eight, he auditioned for a children's play at his local performing arts school. He was the winner of The Hub's Majors & Minors where Idol alumni Jennifer Hudson, Jordin Sparks and Adam Lambert appeared as guest mentors with partnership of RCA Music Group as his prize. In 2016, he moved to Los Angeles after accepting a degree at Musicians Institute. For his audition, he sang "Make It Rain" to the judges. He then progressed to the Showcase Round after performing "Maybe This Time". He also sang Alanis Morissette's "You Oughta Know" to advance in the Top 24. Woodard was one of the two finalists eliminated on May 13, tied at fourth place.
 Catie Turner (born February 14, 2000) was a student from Langhorne, Pennsylvania. She was currently studying at Neshaminy High School. Turner's first experience in music started when she sang The Beatles' "Yellow Submarine" to her mother. At 15 years old after she learned to play guitar and began songwriting, she tried out for Idol back in 2016 but was turned down by the producers before the sixteenth season reboot was announced. She auditioned in New York City and sang her original song "21st Century Machine" to the judges. She also sang The Beatles' "Come Together" and another original song during the solo rounds of Hollywood Week. She sang "Bad Romance" by Lady Gaga in the Showcase Round to earn a spot in the Top 24. She was one of the two finalists eliminated on May 6, tied at sixth place.
 Jurnee (born May 11, 1999) is a waitress from Denver, Colorado. She started singing when she was two years old and began writing her own music at seven years old. After being dismissed at the final round of Hollywood Week since 2016, she came out as a lesbian in which her family was extremely supportive to her. Her partner was a soldier in the United States Army who was recently deployed this year. She performed for corporate and wedding events with the local Moses Jone Band. She returned to the competition at the Savannah auditions and performed "Rise Up" by Andra Day to the judges. She also sang Demi Lovato's "You Don't Do It for Me Anymore" for her first solo performance and Ariana Grande's "One Last Time" to advance in Showcase Week during the Hollywood rounds. She made it to the semifinals after singing "Never Enough". She was one of the two finalists eliminated on May 6, tied at sixth place.
 Dennis Lorenzo (born April 4, 1991) is from Philadelphia, Pennsylvania. His first experience in music was attending the screening of "The Lion King" with his parents following the murder of his father at the age of five. When he was 16, his grandparents bought him an acoustic guitar to start his music career. He was once homeless before settling to Los Angeles and married to his girlfriend with their first daughter. For his audition, he sang "Unaware". He sang two songs in Hollywood Week: "Thinking Out Loud" in the first solo round and "Home" by Daughtry in his final solo performance. He passed Showcase Week by performing "A Song for You" and advanced in the semifinals. He was one of the first three finalists eliminated on April 29.
 Michelle Sussett (born August 2, 1996) is from Miami, Florida. Born in Venezuela, she learned to sing at four years old and was a member of the local children's choir before moving to Miami at the age of eighteen during the oppression at Caracas in 2014. She won $5,000 at the Ultimate Miami Voice competition. She previously auditioned for The Voice and America's Got Talent. After she passed the audition in Los Angeles, she sang "I'm Coming Out" by Diana Ross in Hollywood Week. She also sang "24K Magic" by Bruno Mars and made it the Top 24. She was one of the first three finalists eliminated on April 29.
 Ada Vox (born May 17, 1993) whose birth name was Adam Sanders was a drag queen from San Antonio, Texas. He recently appeared in the twelfth season and was cut in the Top 50 round before the semifinals. As Ada, she sang "The House of the Rising Sun" at the Savannah auditions. After passing Hollywood week, she sang "Creep" by Radiohead to make it into the semifinals. She was one of the first three finalists eliminated on April 29.

Reception

Ratings

Critical response
On the review aggregation website Rotten Tomatoes, the premiere episode holds an approval rating of 70% based on 20 reviews, with an average rating of 6.51/10. Metacritic, which uses a weighted average, assigned the season a score of 60 out of 100 based on eight reviews, indicating "mixed or average reviews".

Concert tour

The top 7 finalists performed for the summer tour along with season 8 winner Kris Allen.

References

External links

American Idol seasons
2018 American television seasons